The Digital Reader 1000 (DR1000) was an e-Book reading device produced by iRex in the Netherlands. Production ceased in 2010, when iRex filed for bankruptcy. The DR1000 was produced with a 10.2-inch (25.9 cm) e-ink display.

Versions
Three different versions were planned:
 DR1000 (without touchscreen)
 DR1000S (with touchscreen)
 DR1000SW (with touchscreen and Wi-Fi & Bluetooth connectivity)

The DR1000 has an internal memory of 128MB, and ships with a 1GB SD card. The manufacturer indicated that this can store up to 1,000 documents or pictures. The S and SW models have touchscreens compatible with Wacom styluses.

Compatible formats
The iRex DR1000 can display various text formats including PDF, TXT, HTML and Mobi. In addition, it can display images in BMP, GIF, JPEG, PNG and TIFF formats.

Criticism
The DR1000 was originally marketed as able to "last days" on a single battery charge, while users reported battery life of 12 hours at most. The "days" statement was removed from the IRex product page around the time that version 1.5 of the device firmware was released.

References

External links
 Irex Digital Reader
 Wayback machine snapshot of specifications at Irex's website

 

Dedicated ebook devices
Electronic paper technology
Linux-based devices
Products introduced in 2008